Myopia is the fourth studio album by Danish singer-songwriter Agnes Obel. It was released on 21 February 2020 by production studio Strange Harvest Limited. Three tracks were released as singles prior to the main release: "Island of Doom", "Broken Sleep" and "Parliament of Owls".

Background 
Obel explained the meaning of Myopia: "For me Myopia is an album about trust and doubt. Can you trust yourself or not? Can you trust your own judgments? Can you trust that you will do the right thing? Can you trust your instincts and what you are feeling? Or are your feelings skewed?"

Style 
In the album, Obel puts a feeling of quiet and gentleness in her music, continuing on from the German concept of Gläserner Bürger, the "citizen of glass", which was the guiding concept of her previous album. The album contains a new sense of solitude instrumentalism and vocals, as well as departing from her upbeat early albums. Obel stated the album was sparked by a struggle to escape her “own tunnel vision”.

Reception 

Myopia was met with generally positive reviews. The Independent reviewer Elisa Bray described it as "an album to experience alone, and there's a comfort to being pulled into Myopias contemplative, isolating territory". Michael Sumsion from PopMatters said Obel's "ethereal and ornate sound channels" traditional forms of jazz, classical, and folk music through "crepuscular flecks of art-pop, trip-hop, and electronica to dazzling effect". Similarly, Pitchforks Ashley Bardhan applauded the record's "ghostly, moody chamber pop" as "a new peak for her lush melancholy". Less enthusiastic was Financial Times critic Ludovic Hunter-Tilney, who found Obel's "pensive nocturnes" admirable but lamented how "the music rarely changes tempo" and "could do with more drama, less gracefulness".

Track listing

Charts

Weekly charts

Year-end charts

References 

2020 albums
Agnes Obel albums